Bart Looije (born 19 December 1968) is a Dutch field hockey player. He competed in the men's tournament at the 1992 Summer Olympics.

References

External links
 

1968 births
Living people
Dutch male field hockey players
Olympic field hockey players of the Netherlands
Field hockey players at the 1992 Summer Olympics
Sportspeople from Rotterdam
1998 Men's Hockey World Cup players
20th-century Dutch people